Lasiodorides is a genus of South American tarantulas that was first described by Günter E. W. Schmidt & B. Bischoff in 1997.

Species
 it contains two species, found in Peru and Ecuador:
Lasiodorides polycuspulatus Schmidt & Bischoff, 1997 (type) – Peru
Lasiodorides striatus (Schmidt & Antonelli, 1996) – Peru

See also
 List of Theraphosidae species

References

Theraphosidae genera
Spiders of South America
Theraphosidae